Amedeo Carboni (born 6 April 1965) is an Italian former footballer who played as a left-back.

In a professional career which spanned 22 years and saw him appear in nearly 700 official games, he played mainly for Roma (seven seasons) and Valencia (nine), winning a combined eight major titles for the two clubs.

Carboni was capped 18 times for the Italy national team, representing them at Euro 1996.

Club career

Early years
Born in Arezzo, Tuscany, Carboni started playing professionally for local A.C. Arezzo, in Serie B. During his spell with the club he was also loaned twice, including a stint at A.S. Bari with which he made his Serie A debut, in a relegation-ending season.

After nearly meeting the same fate with Empoli FC, Carboni spent one season with Parma A.C. in the second division, following which he returned to the top level with U.C. Sampdoria, being first-choice and helping the Genoa team to win the Coppa Italia during his first season and also the UEFA Cup Winners' Cup in his second, playing the full 120 minutes in the final against R.S.C. Anderlecht (2–0 win).

Roma
In the summer of 1990, Carboni joined A.S. Roma, being an undisputed starter during his seven-year spell, with the exception of the 1992–93 campaign due to a serious injury. Under manager Ottavio Bianchi, he won the Italian Cup in 1991 in a 4–2 aggregate victory over former club Sampdoria; he also appeared in the first leg of the UEFA Cup final that year, which ended in a 2–0 defeat to Inter Milan.

Carboni spent his final season as team captain, inheriting the armband from Giuseppe Giannini.

Valencia
Aged already 32, Carboni moved abroad for the first time, signing for Valencia CF in Spain. He appeared in 29 La Liga games in his first season, receiving nine yellow cards and three red as they finished in ninth position, in a campaign which saw manager Jorge Valdano being fired after only three rounds, with the player's countryman Claudio Ranieri taking his place.

Carboni formed an efficient full back partnership with Jocelyn Angloma (born in the same year) in his first years with the Che, eventually helping the team to two national championships – the French had already left the club in the 2003–04 conquest – and five other trophies. He also helped Valencia to the 2000–01 UEFA Champions League final against FC Bayern Munich, but missed his penalty in an eventual shootout loss; during the first 120 minutes, he also committed the penalty that led to the Stefan Effenberg 1–1 equaliser.

The 38-year-old Carboni played 44 competitive matches as Valencia won the league/UEFA Cup double in 2003–04. On 23 October 2005 he became the oldest player at the age of 40 years, six months and 17 days to take the field in the Spanish league, a record previously held by Deportivo de La Coruña's Donato – he had already achieved the feat of being the oldest winner of any European club competition when he won the UEFA Cup.

After the emergence of countryman Emiliano Moretti, Carboni only played five times in 2005–06, and retired from football at the age of 41, having appeared in 346 official games for Valencia. On 19 May 2006, he became the club's director of football.

On 19 June 2007, Carboni was sacked by Valencia as the working relationship between him and coach Quique Sánchez Flores was strained after several disputes. The manager was dismissed himself, after only four months.

Late career
On 10 June 2009, Carboni became the new sporting director at R.E. Mouscron in Belgium, teaming up with former Valencia teammate Miroslav Đukić, who acted as the manager. In early June of the following year he reunited with former Valencia boss Rafael Benítez at Inter Milan, working with the Nerazzurri as technical consultant.

International career
On 21 December 1988, Carboni earned his only cap for the Italy under-21 side, scoring in an 8–0 home rout of Malta. He made his full debut on 25 March 1992 – two weeks shy of his 27th birthday – in a 1–0 friendly home win over Germany.

Carboni was selected by manager Arrigo Sacchi for the squad that appeared at UEFA Euro 1996, playing against the Czech Republic (1–2 loss) and Germany (0–0) in an eventual group stage exit. On 2 April 1997 he made his eighteenth and final appearance, coming on as a substitute in a 0–0 away draw with Poland for the 1998 FIFA World Cup qualifiers as Cesare Maldini was in charge.

Style of play
Carboni was an athletic and hard-working attacking full back, who was known for his surging runs along the left flank as well as his longevity, stamina and defensive consistency.

Personal life
Carboni's older brother, Guido, was also a footballer, and later a manager.

Career statistics

Club

International

Honours
Sampdoria
Coppa Italia: 1988–89
UEFA Cup Winners' Cup: 1989–90

Roma
Coppa Italia: 1990–91

Valencia
La Liga: 2001–02, 2003–04
Copa del Rey: 1998–99
Supercopa de España: 1999
UEFA Cup: 2003–04
UEFA Super Cup: 2004
UEFA Intertoto Cup: 1998

References

External links

CiberChe biography and stats 
National team data   

1965 births
Living people
Sportspeople from Arezzo
Italian footballers
Association football defenders
Serie A players
Serie B players
S.S. Arezzo players
ACF Fiorentina players
S.S.C. Bari players
Parma Calcio 1913 players
U.C. Sampdoria players
A.S. Roma players
La Liga players
Valencia CF players
UEFA Cup winning players
Italy under-21 international footballers
Italy B international footballers
Italy international footballers
UEFA Euro 1996 players
Italian expatriate footballers
Expatriate footballers in Spain
Italian expatriate sportspeople in Spain
Footballers from Tuscany